The  is one of the largest industrial regions in Japan. Its name comes from the on-reading of the kanji used to abbreviate the names of Osaka (大阪) and Kobe (神戸), the two largest cities in the megalopolis. The GDP of this area (Osaka and Kobe) is $341 billion, one of the world's most productive regions.
2014 Osaka and Kobe's GDP per capita (PPP) was US$35,902.

Statistics

(4-digit industrial subclassification)

Main cities and industries

Ōsaka Prefecture

Osaka: medical, chemical, metal
Facilities:
 Rohto Pharmaceutical
 Daiichi Sankyo
 Takeda Pharmaceutical Company
 Sumitomo Chemical
 Sumitomo Electric Industries
 Sharp
 Kansai Paint
 Kansai Electric Power Company
Laboratories, research institutes:
 Rohto Pharmaceutical
 Shionogi Pharmaceutical
 Mitsubishi Tanabe Pharma
 Sumitomo Pharmaceutical
 Sumitomo Chemical

Sakai: chemical, metal 
Facilities:

 ExxonMobil
 Showa Denko
 Ube Industries
 Nippon Oil
 Esso

 Bayer (polyurethane)
 Nippon Steel & Sumitomo Metal
 Mitsui Chemicals
 Mitsubishi Materials
 Osaka Gas

 Daikin Industries
- Air conditioning and chemicals, especially fluorine; has major market share with DuPont.

Laboratories, research institutes:
 Showa Denko
 Sakai Chemical Industry  (titanium dioxide, stabilizers & metallic soaps)
 Kyowa (medical)

Kadoma, Moriguchi, Daito: electronics
Facilities: and research institutes:
 Matsushita Electric Industrial (Panasonic): the headquarters
 Sanyo: the headquarters
 Funai: the headquarters

Other cities in Osaka prefecture
Facilities:
 Kinki Sharyo in Higashiōsaka (manufacturer of railroad vehicles)
 Sunstar in Takatsuki (manufacture and sales of oral care products): the headquarters
 Daihatsu in Ikeda (cars), the headquarters
 Nitto Denko
- A chemical company, specializing in reverse osmosis membrane (a market shared with Dow Chemical Company)

Laboratories, research institutes:
 Nippon Shokubai in Suita (manufacture of catalyst)
 JT (Japan Tobacco) in Takatsuki (medical laboratory)
 Osaka Bioscience Institute in Suita (a national science research institute established by the Ministry of Science and Technology )

Hyōgo Prefecture

Amagasaki: chemical, metal, electronics 
Facilities:

 Sumitomo Metal Industries
 Mitsui Chemicals
 Matsushita Electric Industrial (Panasonic)
- Plasma display

 Asahi Glass Co.
 Sekisui Chemical

 Mitsubishi Electric
- Railroad traffic control system, electric power control system, air traffic control system, Doppler radar, communications satellite, Global Positioning System.
 Osaka Titanium Technologies
- Titanium products (about 20% share of the world market)

Laboratories, research institutes:
 Bayer
- Urethane, polyurethane raw materials
 Mitsubishi Electric
- The largest laboratory of Mitsubishi Electric
- Electric devices and electronics

Kobe: medical, electronics, heavy industries
Facilities:
 Mitsubishi Heavy Industries
- Shipbuilding, marine structures
- container ships, submarines, research vessels and vehicles, nuclear reactors, satellites.
 Kawasaki Heavy Industries
- Shipbuilding, marine structures, trains
 Kobe Steel
 Mitsubishi Electric
 Matsushita Electric Industrial (Panasonic)
 Komatsu (manufactures construction, mining, and military equipment)

Laboratories, research institutes:
 Bayer  Kobe Research Center
 Eli Lilly and Company
 Boehringer Ingelheim
 Procter & Gamble: the East-Asian and Japanese headquarters.
 Kobe Steel
 Mitsubishi Electric
 RIKEN, a public corporation funded by the government; natural sciences research institute
- Center for Developmental Biology.
- Next-Generation Supercomputer Center (From 2010).

Other cities in Hyōgo Prefecture
Facilities:
 Asahi Glass Co. in Takasago
 Caterpillar, Inc. in Akashi
 Fujitsu in Akashi
 Nippon Shokubai in Osaka and Hyogo: catalysts, especially acrylic acid (world share 15%) and super-absorbent polymers (world share 25%)
 Kawasaki Heavy Industries in Akashi: motorcycles
 Kobe Steel in Kakogawa, Takasago
 Nippon Steel in Himeji
 Mitsubishi Heavy Industries in Takasago
 Mitsubishi Electric in Akashi
 Procter & Gamble in Akashi

Laboratories, research institutes:
 Kawasaki Heavy Industries in Akashi
 Kobe Steel in Kakogawa
 Sumitomo Chemical in Takarazuka
 Nippon Shokubai in Himeji: acrylic acid plant

See also
Kansai Science City
Keihanshin industrial region
Osaka-Kobe-Kyoto

References

External links
Mitsubishi Electric Locations
Mitsubishi Electric Products
Mitsubishi Heavy Industries
Osaka (Sumitomo) Titanium technologies Co., Ltd

Industry in Japan
High-technology business districts
Kansai region
Economy of Osaka
Economy of Hyōgo Prefecture
Kobe